Old Stone is a 2016 Chinese-Canadian drama film

Old Stone or variation may also refer to:

 Oldstone Conference (1949) post-war U.S. NAS quantum physics conference
 Old Frankfort Stone High School (built 1892) Frankfort, Indiana, NRHP listed building
 Old Stone Vineyard and Winery, Salisbury, North Carolina
 Old Stone Hotel (built 1851) Warren, Illinois, NRHP listed building
 Old Stone Bank (aka Providence Institution for Savings) (1819-1993) Rhode Island bank
 Bank of the Commonwealth (Kentucky) (aka Old Stone Bank) (built 1809) NRHP listed building

See also
 Old Stone Fort (disambiguation), several forts
 Old Stone Store (disambiguation), several stores
 Old Stone House (disambiguation), several buildings
 Old Stone Church (disambiguation), several churches
 Old Stone Tavern (disambiguation), several taverns
 Old Stone Arch Bridge (disambiguation), several arch bridges
 Old Stone Age
 
 
 Stone (disambiguation)
 Old (disambiguation)